The canton of Le Creusot-2 is an administrative division of the Saône-et-Loire department, eastern France. It was created at the French canton reorganisation which came into effect in March 2015. Its seat is in Le Creusot.

It consists of the following communes:
Le Breuil
Le Creusot (partly)
Saint-Firmin
Saint-Pierre-de-Varennes
Saint-Sernin-du-Bois

References

Cantons of Saône-et-Loire